The Norte is a strong cold  wind which blows from the northeast in Mexico along the Gulf of Mexico. It primarily affects the states along the Coast, including: Tamaulipas, Veracruz, Tabasco, Campeche, and Yucatán.
Unlike El Nino, it's a localized wind and not part of a broader climate pattern.

References

See also
List of local winds

Winds